Charles Baillie, or Bailly (1542–1625), was a Fleming by birth, but a Scot by descent. He was a papal agent and member of the household of Mary, Queen of Scots, following the murder of her husband. Having the mastery of several European languages he was, after Mary's imprisonment, employed in carrying out foreign plots on her behalf.

Arrest and imprisonment
In the spring of 1571, Baillie was about to leave Flanders with copies of a book by the bishop of Ross in defence of Queen Mary, which he had got printed at the Liège press, when Roberto di Ridolfi, the agent of Pope Pius V, entrusted him with letters in cipher for the queen, and also for the Spanish ambassador, the Duke of Norfolk, the Bishop of Ross, and Lord Lumley. They described a plan for a Spanish landing on Mary's behalf in the eastern counties of England. As soon as Baillie set foot on shore at Dover, he was arrested and taken to the Marshalsea. The letters were, however, conveyed in secret by Lord Cobham to the bishop of Ross, who, with the help of the Spanish ambassador, composed other letters of a less incriminating nature to be laid before William Cecil (later Lord Burghley), Queen Elizabeth I's chief advisor.

The scheme might have been successful had Burghley not made use of a traitor, named William Herle (poss. aka Thomas Herle in some sources), to gain Baillie's confidence. Herle described Baillie as "fearful, full of words, glorious, and given to the cup, a man easily read". Herle had also gained the confidence of the bishop, and a complete exposure of the whole plot was imminent when an indiscretion on Herle's part convinced Baillie that he was betrayed. He endeavoured to warn the bishop by a letter, but it was intercepted, and Baillie was conveyed to the Tower of London, where he refused to read the cipher of the letters, and was put on the rack. The following inscription, still visible on the walls, records his reflections inspired by the situation: "L. H. S. 1571 die 10 Aprilis. Wise men ought to se what they do, to examine before they speake; to prove before they take in hand; to beware whose company they use; and, above all things, to whom they truste. |— Charles Bailly."

One night, the figure of a man appeared at Baillie's bedside. He claimed to be John Story, whom Baillie knew to be in the Tower awaiting execution. In reality the figure was that of a traitor of the name of Parker, but Baillie fell into the trap with the same facility as before. On Parker's advice he endeavoured to gain credit with Burghley by deciphering the substituted letters of the bishop of Ross. He revealed also the story of the abstracted packet, and sought to persuade Burghley to grant him his liberty by offering to watch the correspondence of the bishop of Ross. That he gained nothing by following the advice of his second friendly counsellor is attested by an inscription in the Beauchamp Tower as follows: ' Be friend to no one. Be enemye to none. Anno D. 1571, 10 Septr. . '

Later life and death
Baillie probably received his liberty about the same time as the bishop of Ross, in 1573. At any rate it appears, from a letter in the State Papers, that in 1574 he was in Antwerp. He died 27 December 1625, aged 85, and was interred in the churchyard of Hulpe, a village near Brussels, where, in the inscription on his tombstone, he is designated as "Sir Charles Bailly, secretaire de la Royne d'Ecosse" ("Secretary of the Queen of Scots").

References

1542 births
1625 deaths
16th-century Scottish people
17th-century Scottish people
Flemish people
Scottish Roman Catholics
16th-century Roman Catholics
17th-century Roman Catholics
Prisoners in the Tower of London